Brian Priestley (born 10 July 1940) is an English jazz writer, pianist and arranger.

Biography
He was born in Manchester, England. Priestley began studying music at the age of eight. In the 1960s he gained a degree in modern languages from Leeds University, while playing in student bands. In the mid-1960s, he began contributing to the jazz press and was responsible for entries in Jazz on Record: A Critical Guide to the First Fifty Years, 1917–67  (1968), edited by Albert McCarthy.

In 1969, Priestley moved to London and began playing piano with bands led by Tony Faulkner and Alan Cohen. Priestley helped transcribe Duke Ellington's Black, Brown and Beige, and Creole Rhapsody for Cohen, and formed his own Special Septet featuring Digby Fairweather and Don Rendell. His compositions include Blooz For Dook (published in his 1986 book Jazz Piano 4), The Whole Thing (recorded by the National Youth Jazz Orchestra in 1997) and Jamming With Jools (a 1998 examination piece for the Associated Board of Royal Schools of Music, based on a live broadcast with Jools Holland).

He is also known for broadcasting work on the BBC as well as London Jazz FM, and his weekly series for BBC Radio London, influenced the renewed interest in jazz in the 1980s. Priestley taught jazz piano at Goldsmiths College from 1977 until 1993, and has taught jazz history for various other universities and conservatoires over the years. Priestley has also written biographies of Charles Mingus, John Coltrane and Charlie Parker, as well as the book Jazz on Record: A History. He co-authored The Rough Guide to Jazz, as well as contributing to several other reference books, and has compiled and/or annotated more than a hundred reissue compilations.

Since 2006, Priestley has lived in Tralee, Ireland, where he continues playing the piano and presents a show on Radio Kerry.

Discography
 Love You Gladly (1988; Cadillac)
 You Taught My Heart to Sing (1994; w/Don Rendell; Spirit of Jazz)
 Love You Madly (1999; Louise Gibbs/Brian Priestley/Tony Coe; 33 Jazz)
 Who Knows (2004; 33 Jazz)

Literature
Priestley. Charlie Parker, Hippocrene Books, Tunbridge Wells 1984, 
Priestley. Chasin' the Bird – The Life and Legacy of Charlie Parker, Oxford University Press 2007, 
Priestley. Jazz on Record: A History, Elm Tree Books, London 1988, 
Priestley. Jazz Piano (Vols.) 1 - 6, (transcribed solos by 53 pianists), IMP, London 1983–1990
Priestley. John Coltrane, Apollo Press, London 1986, 
Priestley. Mingus. A Critical Biography, Da Capo Press, New York 1985, 
Priestley, Digby Fairweather, Ian Carr. Jazz. The Rough Guide (The Essential Companion to Artists and Albums), 3rd edition, Rough Guides, 2004,  (formerly as Jazz. The Essential Companion, Grafton Books 1988)
Priestley. Digby Fairweather, Jazz: 100 Essential CDs. The Rough Guide, London 2001,  
Priestley, Dave Gelly, Paul Trynka, Tony Bacon, The Sax and Brass Book – Saxophones, Trumpets and Trombones in Jazz, Rock and Pop, Balafon Books, London 1998,

References

External Links
 

1940 births
British music arrangers
English jazz pianists
English radio personalities
Living people
Musicians from Manchester
English writers about music
Radio Kerry presenters
21st-century pianists
National Youth Jazz Orchestra members